Umm Salamuna is a Palestinian village located twelve kilometers South-west of Bethlehem. The village is in the Bethlehem Governorate in the southern West Bank. According to the Palestinian Central Bureau of Statistics, the village had a population of 945 in 2007. The primary healthcare is obtained in Beit Fajjar where the Ministry of Heath have classified the care facilities as level 3.

History

Ottoman era
In 1883, the PEF's Survey of Western Palestine noted "Heaps of stones" at Kh. Umm Salamôni.

British Mandate era
In the 1931 census the population of Umm Salamuna was counted together with Beit Fajjar, Marah Ma'alla and Marah Rabah. The total population was 1043, all Muslims, in 258 houses.

Jordanian era
In the wake of the 1948 Arab–Israeli War, and after the 1949 Armistice Agreements, Umm Salumuna came under  It was Jordanian rule.

In 1961, the population was 118.

Post-1967
Since the Six-Day War in 1967, Umm Salamuna has been held under Israeli occupation.

After the 1995 accords, 20.2% of Umm Salamuna land was classified as Area B, while the remaining 79.8% was classified as Area C. Israel has planned that 326 dunams of village land (or 14.9 percent of the total area of Umm Salamuna) will be isolated from the village on the Israeli side of the West Bank barrier.

Footnotes

Bibliography

External links
Welcome To Khirbat Umm Salamunah
Survey of Western Palestine, Map 21:    IAA, Wikimedia commons
West Bank road closures
Um Salamuna village (fact sheet), Applied Research Institute–Jerusalem (ARIJ)
 Umm Salamuna village profile, ARIJ
Um Salamuna aerial photo, ARIJ
The priorities and needs for development in Umm Salamuna village based on the community and local authorities’ assessment, ARIJ

Villages in the West Bank
Bethlehem Governorate
Municipalities of the State of Palestine